The Aston Villa Under-21s, formerly known as Aston Villa Reserves and Aston Villa Under-23s, are the most senior youth development team of Aston Villa and compete in Premier League 2 (Division 2) of the Professional Development League, the Premier League Cup and the EFL Trophy in the 2022–23 season. The team plays its home games at Aston Villa's training ground, Bodymoor Heath and occasionally Villa Park. Aston Villa also have an academy side that competes in the Under-18 division of the Professional Development League, the U18 Premier League Cup and the FA Youth Cup annually, most recently winning the latter trophy in the 2020-21 season. They also field a youth side in the Birmingham Senior Cup annually.

The team were part of the FA Premier Reserve League since its foundation in 1999 and were winners of the 2011-12 Premier Reserve League South title, the last in that format. The side has been successful in recent decades, as well as becoming national champions in the 2003–04 and 2009–10 seasons, the team also won four out of five Southern Championships between 2007 and 2012, before the format changed to the Professional Development League. The side also won the NextGen Series in 2013, a Europe-wide tournament for elite academies.

Current senior squad players Keinan Davis, Tim Iroegbunam, Jacob Ramsey, Cameron Archer, and Jaden Philogene-Bidace all came through the youth system at the club. Notable former players to have come through the Villa academy include Jack Grealish, Brian Little, Gabriel Agbonlahor, Ciaran Clark, Gary Cahill, Gareth Barry, Thomas Hitzlsperger, Darius Vassell, Marc Albrighton, Andreas Weimann, Brian McClair, and Steven Davis among many others. The U21 team is made up of players under the age of 21, although five over-age outfield players and an over-age goalkeeper may be named in a Premier League 2 match squad, these may include fringe first-team players and senior players recovering from injury.

History
The origins of the team date back to 1892, when Aston Villa Reserves joined the Birmingham & District League. After finishing in the runners-up position twice in the first 2 seasons of the competition, Villa finally won their first trophy in the 1894–95 season, winning 26 out of 30 league games and losing just once all season. Several titles followed after this achievement, including a run of 8 consecutive titles between 1902 and 1910. When Villa finally left the Birmingham & District League in 1915, they had accumulated a total of 12 league titles and 6 runners-up finishes.

After that, the reserve team played in the Central League for many years, becoming champions in 1929–30, 1963–64 and 1992–93.

In 1999–2000, the FA Premier Reserve League was set up, Villa were one of the founding members, and were split into the Northern section of the league. Three disappointing seasons followed, however in the 2003–04 season, inspired by brothers Stefan Moore and Luke Moore, Villa eased to their first title. In the two seasons which followed (2004–05 and 2005–06), Villa agonisingly finished both campaigns as runners-up, both times to Manchester United. In the 2006–07 season, for the first time since its introduction, the FA Premier Reserve League excluded Coca-Cola Championship teams from playing in the league, with the 20 senior English Premiership teams parallelling the teams involved in the FA Premier League. This also meant that due to geographical circumstances, Aston Villa Reserves were switched from the Northern Division, to the Southern equivalent, for the first time since the start of the original format in 1999. Villa eventually finished 4th - winning 9 out of their 18 games, with Luke Moore the top goalscorer, with 7. The season saw the impressive development of several youngsters, most notably including Zoltán Stieber, Shane Lowry and Stephen O'Halloran, all of which were rewarded with first-team opportunities in the pre-season fixtures, prior to the 2007–08 season.

Inspired by Swedish striker Tobias Mikaelsson, Aston Villa Reserves clinched the 2007–08 Southern title, their second regional success since the inception of the league in 1999. However, they were beaten 3–0 in the Play-Off Final by Northern champions Liverpool.

In the 2008–09 season, the team went one better by securing their second consecutive Southern title, and then defeating Sunderland to claim their first ever national title, with goals from Nathan Delfouneso, James Collins and Shane Lowry.

Andreas Weimann netted nine goals, to help Villa keep up their trend of securing the Southern title - their third consecutively - in the 2009–10 season. This included a remarkable 15-game unbeaten streak, running from the opening game of the campaign, all the way through to the last game of the season against Portsmouth. However, the club were denied a second consecutive national title, as they were beaten on penalties by Manchester United, after a 3–3 draw at Old Trafford.

The 2010–11 season saw changes to the standard format of the league. Only 16 clubs competed, which meant a split between the top heavy Northern league. Undoubtedly the highlight of the season, was a 10–1 home victory over Arsenal at the Greene King Stadium, en route to finishing third in the league.

Following changes arrived in the 2011–12 season. Three leagues were abolished, returning to two, whilst each team played the teams in their own league home and away. They also played each team in the regional league once, with home and away games split evenly. More success followed however, as Villa picked up another Southern title, with Andreas Weimann scoring nine times during the course of the season. It was a case of deja vu however, as they were again beaten on penalties by Manchester United at Old Trafford.

The Premier Reserve League was abolished during the summer of 2012, to make way for the Professional Development League 1. Aston Villa were one of 22 clubs to take part in the inaugural season, participating in Group 2 of the competition.

During the 13-year tenure of the original Reserve system, Aston Villa were the second most successful club - behind Manchester United - with five regional titles and one national title. The youth sides currently play their home matches at Villa Park and Bodymoor Heath.

From 2019, having been promoted back to the Premier League, Aston Villa began fielding an under-21 side in the EFL Trophy against League One and League Two opposition.

In January 2021, after a coronavirus outbreak in the first team, the youth team was used for a first team game against Liverpool in the FA cup 3rd round.

Aston Villa Under-21s

Squad 

Players under 21 to have made their senior league debut are listed in the senior squad.

Out on loan

Reserve, U21 & U23 Honours

Birmingham & District League
Winners:
1894/95, 1895/96, 1899/1900, 1902/03, 1903/04, 1904/05, 1905/06, 1906/07, 1907/08, 1908/09, 1909/10, 1911/12, 1959-60 (Division Two).
Runners-Up:
1892/93, 1893/94, 1897/98, 1898/99, 1900/01, 1910/11.

Birmingham Senior Cup
Winners:
1879/80, 1881/82, 1882/83, 1883/84, 1884/85, 1887/88, 1888/89, 1889/90, 1890/91, 1895/96, 1898/99, 1902/03, 1903/04, 1905/06, 1907/08, 1908/09, 1909/10, 1911/12, 1984/85.
Runners-Up:
1875/76, 1880/81, 1892/93, 1894/95, 1900/01, 1901/02, 1923/24, 1982/83, 1994/95, 1995/96.

FA Premier Reserve League North
Winners:
2003/04.
Runners-Up:
2004/05, 2005/06.

FA Premier Reserve League South
Winners:
2007/08, 2008/09, 2009/10, 2011/12

FA Premier League Cup
Winners:
2017/18

FA Premier Reserve League
Winners:
2008/09.
Runners-Up:
2007/08, 2009/10, 2011/12.

Aston Villa Academy
Aston Villa Academy is the youth development side of Premier League team Aston Villa, it fields an under-18s team in the U18 Professional Development League 1 (South Division). Until 2012 the team competed in Group B of the now defunct FA Premier Academy League.

In the 2009/10 season Villa clinched top spot in Group B of the Premier Academy League, impressively notching the most wins (22), most points (68) and most goals (84) of all 41 clubs involved. Villa's youngsters were drawn against Group A winners Arsenal in the semi-final, which was won via a single strike from Nathan Delfouneso. This subsequently meant a final against FA Youth Cup winners Manchester City, which was comprehensively won 2–0, with goals from James Collins and Chris Herd. The top scorers for the season were Irish striker James Collins (23), Austrian striker Andreas Weimann (16) and English striker Nathan Delfouneso (15).The 2008/09 season was less fruitful for Villa's youngsters, as they finished 3rd in Group B, and were knocked out of the FA Youth Cup at the first hurdle, losing in the Third Round to eventual champions Arsenal.

Villa's youth team has a strong history in the FA Youth Cup with wins in 1972, 1980, 2002 and 2021.  Villa also reached the semi-finals of the FA Youth Cup in 2004, eventually being knocked out by eventual runners-up Chelsea.

The team train at Bodymoor Heath in North Warwickshire and also play their home matches there on weekends.

Invitational Tournaments

Hong Kong Soccer Sevens
The annual invitational seven-a-side Hong Kong Soccer Sevens tournament brings together academy sides from around the world, and has brought notable success to Aston Villa's academy between 1999 and 2019. Villa won the main tournament six times, more than any other team.

Villa won the third HK Soccer Sevens tournament in 2002, defeating Arsenal in the final, they went on to defend their title in 2004 (as the 2003 competition was cancelled due to the SARS outbreak), inspired by Stephen Cooke and Steven Foley they clinched the trophy in the final against Manchester United. Striker Gabriel Agbonlahor captained Villa to the semi-final in 2006 - losing to the eventual winners Urawa Red Diamonds - and also received the 'Player of the Tournament' accolade. Villa won the competition again in May 2010, beating Central Coast Mariners of Australia in the final. The most recent HK Soccer Sevens tournament came in 2019, where Villa won the secondary 'plate' trophy; players including Akos Onodi, Lewis Brunt and Cameron Archer featured.

NextGen Series
The Aston Villa Academy played in both seasons of the now defunct NextGen Series, a tournament for Europe's elite football academies between 2011 and 2013. The team was composed of under-18s with up to three under-19s in each matchday squad. Having made the quarter-finals in the 2011-12 Series, the academy side captained by Samir Carruthers won the final of the 2012-13 tournament on 1 April 2013 beating Chelsea 2–0, at the Stadio Giuseppe Sinigaglia, in Como, Italy.

CEE Cup
Aston Villa sent an under-19 side to the invitational CEE Cup in the Czech Republic for the first time in 2022, competing against the youth sides of elite sides from around the world including Palmeiras, Tigres UANL and Dynamo Kiev. Villa narrowly lost all three of their matches, finishing 6th in the overall rankings, Kerr Smith and Todd Alcock scored for Villa during the competition.

Academy squad 
 Players not listed in the official squad are referenced individually.

Academy honours

NextGen Series
Winners:
2012–13

FA Youth Cup
Winners:
1972, 1980, 2002, 2021
Runners-Up:
1978, 2004

FA Premier Academy League U17s
Winners:
2003–04

FA Premier Academy League U18s: Group B
Winners:
2007–08
2010–11

FA Premier Academy League U18s: Play-Offs
Winners:
2007–08
Runners-Up:
2007

HKFC International Soccer Sevens
Winners:
2002, 2004, 2007, 2008, 2010, 2016

Non-playing staff

Corporate hierarchy 

Reference:

Management hierarchy

Notable Academy Graduates
The following players have all been members of the Aston Villa academy before their professional debut and have either made at least one appearance for the Villa first team in professional competition, have gone on to play in a fully professional league, or have represented their national team. Players in bold are still contracted to the club.

2020s

2010s

2000s

1990s

References

Reserves and Academy
Football academies in England
Birmingham Combination
Premier League International Cup
NextGen series